The 2013 OFC U-20 Championship was the 19th edition of the OFC Under 20 Qualifying Tournament, the biennial football championship of Oceania (OFC). The competition was held at two venues in Fiji, from the 21 to 29 March, with the winner qualifying as Oceania's representative at the 2013 FIFA U-20 World Cup.

New Zealand, the previous title holders, won this year's edition.

Participating teams

 (Host Nation)

Venues
Four matchdays were held at Churchill Park in Lautoka with the last matchday being held at Govind Park in Ba.

Group stage
The competition draw was conducted on February 8 at the headquarters of the Oceania confederation in Auckland, New Zealand.

Awards
The Golden Ball Award was awarded to the most outstanding player of the tournament. The Golden Glove Award was awarded to the best goalkeeper of the tournament. The Golden Boot Award was awarded to the top scorer of the tournament. The Fair Play Award was awarded to the team with the best disciplinary record at the tournament.

References

External links
OFC Site

2013
2012–13 in OFC football
2013 in Fijian sport
2013 Ofc U-20 Championship
2013 in youth association football